Scaphopetalum blackii is a flowering plant species of the genus Scaphopetalum of the plant family Malvaceae described by Maxwell T. Masters in 1867.

References

blackii
Plants described in 1867